Ernest Butler (13 May 1919 – 31 January 2002) was an English footballer.

He signed for Portsmouth from Bath City and served in the Royal Navy during the Second World War and was a guest goalkeeper for Tranmere Rovers when stationed on Merseyside . Whilst at Portsmouth he won back-to-back Football League Championships.

References
Specific

External links
 

1919 births
2002 deaths
English footballers
Portsmouth F.C. players
English Football League players
People from Wiltshire
Association football goalkeepers
Royal Navy personnel of World War II